A destroying angel is any of several closely related deadly species of Amanita mushrooms.

Destroying angel may also refer to:
 Destroying angel (Bible), in various passages
 "Destroying Angel" (Midsomer Murders episode)
 Destroying Angel (film), a 1923 American silent film directed by W. S. Van Dyke
 Destroying Angel, a 1987 Anglo-Yugoslavian film directed by Arne Mattsson, later retitled Sleep Well My Love
 Destroying Angel, a science fiction novel by Richard Paul Russo
 "Destroying Angel", a song by Sneaker Pimps from Splinter
 Destroying Angels, members of the Mormon Danites
 "The Destroying Angel", a song by Anaal Nathrakh from Eschaton
 "Destroying Angels, a song by Garbage with John Doe and Exene Cervenka of X
 “Destroying Angel” is the second episode from the 1972 TV series Van Der Valk.

See also 
 Angel of Death (disambiguation)
 Angel of Destruction, a film
 Avenging Angel (disambiguation)
 Death angel (disambiguation)